Jorge Corrula (born 16 March 1978) is a Portuguese actor and fashion model. He got his first major role in the hit teen series Morangos com Açúcar (2004). Later, was a cast member of various television productions: Resistirei (2007/08), Floribella (2006/08), Sete Vidas (2006/07), Mistura Fina (2004/05) among others.

In 2004, he was cast as the title character of the 2005 film O Crime do Padre Amaro.

Filmography
Vampiro (2005)
O Crime do Padre Amaro (2005)

Television

Telenovelas
Mar de Paixão (2010)
Flor do Mar (2008)
Resistirei (2007)

Series
Destino Imortal (2010)
Uma Aventura na Casa Assombrada (2009)
Aqui não há quem viva (2008)
7 Vidas (2006)

External links
 

1978 births
Living people
Portuguese male television actors